The M8 High-Speed Tractor was an artillery tractor used by the US Army and Marine Corps from 1950.

Construction
The M8 is a full-track tractor based on the chassis of the M41 Walker Bulldog light tank. It was used to tow cargo trailers and artillery such as the Skysweeper 75 mm anti-aircraft gun and the M59 Long Tom gun. The basic M8 variant could be quickly adapted for carrying projectiles and charges. Unusually for a tractor, the M8's engine was located at the front of the cab. Some M8s were equipped with a hydraulic M5 dozer blade.

History
The M8 was developed following the failure of the T33 cargo-carrier, which was based on the M24 Chaffee light tank chassis. The new, standardized M8 was produced between 1950 and 1955.

See also
 G-numbers (G-252)
 M-numbers

References

 TM 9-7406
 SNL G266

Artillery tractors
Military vehicles of the United States
Military vehicles introduced in the 1950s